The 11th U-boat Flotilla (German 11. Unterseebootsflottille) was formed on 15 May 1942 in Bergen, Norway. The flotilla operated mainly in the North Sea and against the Russian convoys (JW, PQ, QP and RA series) in the Arctic Sea. The flotilla operated various marks of the Type VII U-boat until September 1944, when it had an influx of some Type IX boats from France. It also was the only flotilla to field the Type XXI U-boat for operational use, but the war ended before  saw action. The Flotilla was disbanded on 9 May 1945 with the German surrender.

Flotilla commanders

External links

11
Military units and formations of the Kriegsmarine
Military units and formations established in 1942
Military units and formations disestablished in 1945
1942 establishments in Norway